The Museum of Prehistoric Anthropology is located within the Jardin Exotique de Monaco. It was opened in 1902 and contains a collection of fossils and other excavated artifacts relating to the prehistory of Monaco and areas nearby.

See also
 List of museums in Monaco

References
Museum of Prehistoric Anthropology at Visitmonaco.com

Anthropology museums
Museums established in 1902
Museums in Monaco